is a passenger railway station in the city of Toride, Ibaraki Prefecture, Japan operated by the private railway company Kantō Railway.

Lines

Station layout
The station consists of two opposed side platforms, connected to the ground-level station building by a level crossing. The station is unattended.

Platforms

Adjacent stations

History
Terahara Station was opened on 1 November 1913 as a station on the Jōsō Railway, which became the Kantō Railway in 1965.

Passenger statistics
In fiscal 2018, the station was used by an average of 1942 passengers daily (boarding passengers only).

Surrounding area
Toride City Hall
Toride Post Office

See also
 List of railway stations in Japan

References

External links

 Kantō Railway Station Information 

Railway stations in Ibaraki Prefecture
Railway stations in Japan opened in 1913
Toride, Ibaraki